A pseudorandom sequence of numbers is one that appears to be statistically random, despite having been produced by a completely deterministic and repeatable process.

Background
The generation of random numbers has many uses, such as for random sampling, Monte Carlo methods, board games, or gambling.  In physics, however, most processes, such as gravitational acceleration, are deterministic, meaning that they always produce the same outcome from the same starting point.  Some notable exceptions are radioactive decay and quantum measurement, which are both modeled as being truly random processes in the underlying physics.  Since these processes are not practical sources of random numbers, people use pseudorandom numbers, which ideally have the unpredictability of a truly random sequence, despite being generated by a deterministic process.

In many applications, the deterministic process is a computer algorithm called a pseudorandom number generator, which must first be provided with a number called a random seed.  Since the same seed will yield the same sequence every time, it is important that the seed be well chosen and kept hidden, especially in security applications, where the pattern's unpredictability is a critical feature.

In some cases where it is important for the sequence to be demonstrably unpredictable, people have used physical sources of random numbers, such as radioactive decay, atmospheric electromagnetic noise harvested from a radio tuned between stations, or intermixed timings of people's keystrokes. The time investment needed to obtain these numbers leads to a compromise: using some of these physics readings as a seed for a pseudorandom number generator.

History
Before modern computing, researchers requiring random numbers would either generate them through various means (dice, cards, roulette wheels, etc.) or use existing random number tables.

The first attempt to provide researchers with a ready supply of random digits was in 1927, when the Cambridge University Press published a table of 41,600 digits developed by L.H.C. Tippett. In 1947, the RAND Corporation generated numbers by the electronic simulation of a roulette wheel; the results were eventually published in 1955 as A Million Random Digits with 100,000 Normal Deviates.

In computational complexity
In theoretical computer science, a distribution is pseudorandom against a class of adversaries if no adversary from the class can distinguish it from the uniform distribution with significant advantage.
This notion of pseudorandomness is studied in computational complexity theory and has applications to cryptography.

Formally, let S and T be finite sets and let F = {f: S → T} be a class of functions.

In typical applications, the class F describes a model of computation with bounded resources and one is interested in designing distributions D with certain properties that are pseudorandom against F.  The distribution D is often specified as the output of a pseudorandom generator.

See also
 Cryptographically secure pseudorandom number generator
 List of random number generators
 Pseudorandom binary sequence
 Pseudorandom ensemble
 Pseudorandom number generator
 Quasi-random sequence
 Random number generation
 Pseudorandom noise

Further reading
 Donald E. Knuth (1997) The Art of Computer Programming, Volume 2: Seminumerical Algorithms (3rd edition). Addison-Wesley Professional, 
 Oded Goldreich. (2008) Computational Complexity: a conceptual perspective. Cambridge University Press. .

External links 
 HotBits: Genuine random numbers, generated by radioactive decay
 Using and Creating Cryptographic-Quality Random Numbers
 In RFC 4086, the use of pseudorandom number sequences in cryptography is discussed at length.

References

 
Theoretical computer science